Sword of Venus is a 1953 American adventure film directed by Harold Daniels, written by Jack Pollexfen and Aubrey Wisberg, and starring Robert Clarke, Catherine McLeod, Dan O'Herlihy, William Schallert and Marjorie Stapp. It was released on February 20, 1953, by RKO Pictures. It was also released in the U.K. as The Island of Monte Cristo.

Plot
The Count of Monte Cristo's son is framed for a murder he didn't commit by a man who is plotting to get his hands on his wealth, a man who was one of his father's deadliest enemies.

Cast 
Robert Clarke as Robert Dantes
Catherine McLeod as Claire
Dan O'Herlihy as Danglars
William Schallert as Valmont 
Marjorie Stapp as Duchess De Villefort
Merritt Stone as Fernand
Renee De Marco as Suzette
Eric Colmar as Goriot
Stuart Randall as Hugo

Production
The producers wanted Ron Randell for a lead role.

References

External links 
 

1953 films
American adventure films
1953 adventure films
American black-and-white films
RKO Pictures films
Films produced by Aubrey Wisberg
Films with screenplays by Aubrey Wisberg
1950s English-language films
Films directed by Harold Daniels
1950s American films